Moyna High School is a Higher Secondary School situated at Gazole Block, in Malda district. This school was established in 1969.

Affiliations 
The school is affiliated to West Bengal Board of Secondary Education for Upper Primary & Madhyamik and to West Bengal Council of Higher Secondary Education

See also
Education in India
List of schools in India
Education in West Bengal

References

External links

Schools in Malda district
Educational institutions established in 1969
1969 establishments in West Bengal